The Lion class was a class of six fast battleships designed for the Royal Navy (RN) in the late 1930s. They were a larger, improved version of the preceding King George V class, with  guns. Only two ships were laid down before the Second World War began in September 1939 and a third was ordered during the war, but their construction was suspended shortly afterwards. The design was modified in light of war experience in 1942, but the two ships already begun were scrapped later in the year.

None of the other ships planned were laid down, although there was a proposal in 1941 to modify one of the suspended ships into a hybrid battleship-aircraft carrier with two 16-inch gun turrets and a flight deck. Preliminary work for a new design began in 1944 and continued for the next year or so until the RN realised that they were unaffordable in the post-war financial environment.

Design and description

The design of the Lion-class battleships was influenced by the terms of several arms control treaties of the 1920s and 1930s. The Washington Naval Treaty of 1922 had banned new battleship construction, with certain specified exceptions, for a decade. The London Naval Treaty of 1930 extended the ban for five more years, which meant that almost all the First World War-era ships would be eligible for replacement by the Washington Treaty's rules when the London Treaty expired. The British government intended for the 1935 Second London Naval Disarmament Conference to prevent a naval arms race that Britain could ill afford, but the Japanese refusal to sign the resulting Second London Naval Treaty of 1936 thwarted that hope.
The three signatories, Britain, France and the United States had agreed to limit the size and gun calibre for the battleships that would be built by the signatories. This dictated the choice of the 14-inch gun for the main battery of the King George Vs (KGV). The treaty contained an "Escalator Clause" that would increase the maximum allowable calibre to 16 inches if the Japanese government failed to sign; this was triggered in April 1937.

The Board of Admiralty then began preliminary design work on a 35,000-long-ton ship armed with 16-inch guns and it was promising enough that the Director of Naval Construction (DNC) was ordered to further investigate such designs. To save design time, many of the features of the KGVs were incorporated in the new design, but the limited size of the ship was a real challenge for the designers. Maintaining the same speed, protection, and secondary armament as the older ships while using 16-inch guns proved impossible while remaining within the treaty limits. In an effort to remain within treaty limits, the overall weight of armour was slightly reduced and two twin  gun turrets as well as aircraft and their facilities were eliminated.

The treaty-imposed design problems became irrelevant on 31 March 1938, when the signatories of the Treaty invoked the tonnage escalation clause because the Japanese refused to provide any information about their battleship construction programme and the signatories feared that their new ships could be outclassed by the new Japanese battleships. The Admiralty in any case decided to limit itself to 40,000 long tons and nine 16-inch guns on the grounds that larger vessels would be unable to dock at the major Royal Navy dockyards at Rosyth or Portsmouth. A new design was prepared with more armour, more powerful machinery, the two twin 5.25-inch gun turrets restored, and four aircraft added. The Admiralty approved this design on 15 December and bids were solicited very shortly afterwards.

1938 design
The appearance of the Lions closely resembled that of the KGVs, but included a transom stern to improve steaming efficiency at high speed. The crew complement was estimated to be about 1,680 officers and ratings.

In the interests of saving time, the four-shaft unit machinery design from the KGVs was duplicated with alternating boiler and engine rooms. The Lion-class ships would have had four sets of geared Parsons steam turbine sets housed in separate engine rooms, each driving one propeller shaft. The turbines and boilers could be cross-connected in an emergency. The ships were designed to carry  of fuel oil. They would have been equipped with six  turbogenerators and two 330-kW diesel generators that supplied the common ring main at 220 volts.

The Lion-class ships' main armament consisted of nine newly designed 45-calibre BL 16-inch Mark II guns in three hydraulically powered triple-gun turrets. The maximum elevation of the turrets was increased to +40° although the guns were loaded at +5°. Their rate of fire was two rounds per minute and the ships carried 100 shells per gun. The secondary armament consisted of sixteen 50-calibre QF 5.25-inch Mk I dual-purpose guns in eight twin-gun mounts. They had a maximum depression of −5° and a maximum elevation of +70°. Their normal rate of fire was about 7–8 rounds per minute and 400 rounds were provided for each gun. Short-range air defence was provided by 48 QF 2-pounder "pom-pom" guns in six octuple mountings. The gun's rate of fire was approximately 96–98 rounds per minute and 1800 rounds per gun were carried by the ships.

Their armour scheme was virtually identical to that of the KGVs. At the aft end of the steering gear compartment would have been a  transverse bulkhead. The KCA face-plates of the main gun turrets were intended to be 15 inches thick and their roofs would have used  non-cemented armour plates. Their sides remained  in thickness. The barbettes for the 16-inch guns were intended to be 15 inches thick on the sides, tapering to  closer to the centreline of the ship.

The armour continued forward and aft of the citadel at the lower-deck level. Forward it tapered in steps from five inches down to  near the bow. Unlike the Germans, French and Americans, the British no longer believed that heavy armour for the conning tower served any real purpose, given that the chance of hitting the conning tower was very small, and protected the forward conning tower with only  of armour.

It was bounded on the inside by the  torpedo bulkhead. Both of the inner and outer voids were fitted with pumps to flood them with water to level the ship (counter-flood) in case she began to list. Over the length of the citadel, this system was found to be proof against  of TNT during full-scale trials.

Naval historians William Garzke and Robert Dulin believe that the design of the Lion class would have corrected some of the deficiencies of the KGVs with the notable exceptions of the too-shallow torpedo protection system, caused by limits of the existing infrastructure, and the limited endurance, both of which were addressed in the revised 1942 design. Their 16-inch main battery, although not the most powerful in the world, were superior to the earlier guns used in the s, and they "would have been the most powerful and fastest battleships to have served in the Royal Navy."

1942 design
Construction was suspended shortly after the war began and the Admiralty took advantage of the time to refine the design in light of war experience in late 1941. The beam increase meant that many of the Royal Navy home docking facilities, including Rosyth and Portsmouth, could no longer accommodate these ships. The requirement that 'A' turret had to be able to fire directly ahead at 0° elevation was rescinded as it radically reduced freeboard forward and caused the KGVs to take a lot of water over the bow in head seas. The space in the superstructure freed up by these changes was used to increase the light anti-aircraft armament to nine octuple and one quadruple 2-pounder mounts.

No changes were made to the propulsion machinery, but the speed decreased to  because of the greater displacement. Because the light cruiser  lost all steam power when she struck a mine early in the war, two diesel generators were substituted for two turbo-generators. The ships' crew was estimated at 1,750 officers and ratings.

1944 design
The RN's Plans Division set a requirement for a dozen battleships for the post-war navy and the DNC began another design in February 1944 that would incorporate wartime lessons, but they soon concluded that "the power of modern weapons had increased so much that ever-increasing armour and torpedo protection was required until it became incompatible with the limited offensive power of the ship." The main armament was revised to an improved Mk IV version of the 16-inch gun in a new Mk III turret that fired a heavier shell at a marginally lower velocity, mounted in three triple turrets. They would also carry twelve twin QF  Mk V guns as their secondary armament and one twin and ten sextuple Bofors mounts plus fifty 20 mm Oerlikons for anti-aircraft protection. This design was too large, so multiple variants were considered over the next several months, examining the effects of reducing side armour, underwater protection and the number of main and secondary gun turrets. This greatly hampered the ability of the designers to reduce the size of the design as only those variants with two main gun turrets were below  at standard displacement. The most radical variant, christened 'Design X', had an armour arrangement similar to the modernised battlecruiser  with a pair of 16-inch and eight 4.5-inch turrets and had only minimal underwater protection, relying on tight compartmentalisation and strengthened internal bulkheads to localise damage. This yielded a  ship at standard load.

That same month a committee headed by Rear-Admiral Reginald Servaes reviewed all the proposals and the Admiralty requested a sketch design of 'X' with two 16-inch turrets, both forward of the superstructure as in the French , and a thicker waterline belt in May that the DNC designated 'X3'. This displaced  at standard load. The DNC asked permission to investigate further methods of reducing the size of 'B3' in July and work continued on both designs through October. By this time the impossibility of even maintaining the existing battle fleet, much less building such large battleships, had become clear in light of Britain's economic difficulties and further design work was informally suspended on all but the new Mk IV gun and its Mk III turret; this was finally cancelled by the First Sea Lord on 10 March 1949.

Hybrid aircraft carrier
On 8 January 1941, Rear-Admiral Bruce Fraser, Third Sea Lord and Controller of the Navy, asked the DNC to work up a hybrid aircraft carrier based on the Lion-class hull. Two months later, a sketch design was presented for consideration, but it was not well regarded by the participants. This design retained all three main gun turrets and the flight deck was deemed too short to be useful. A revised version with only the two forward turrets retained was requested and was ready in July. The hybrid's armament consisted of six 16-inch guns in two triple turrets, sixteen 5.25-inch guns and eight octuple 2-pounder mounts. Twelve fighters and two torpedo bombers could be carried. The Director of Naval Gunnery's assessment was that "The functions and requirements of carriers and of surface gun platforms are entirely incompatible ... the conceptions of these designs ... is evidently the result of an unresolved contest between a conscious acceptance of aircraft and a subconscious desire for a 1914 Fleet ... these abortions are the results of a psychological maladjustment. The necessary readjustments should result from a proper re-analysis of the whole question, what would be a balanced fleet in 1945, 1950 or 1955?" The design was rejected.

Construction
Six Lion-class ships were planned, two each in the 1938, 1939, and 1940 Naval Programmes. The first pair, Lion and Temeraire, were ordered on 28 February 1939 from Vickers Armstrongs and Cammell Laird, respectively. Lion was laid down at Vickers' Walker, Newcastle upon Tyne shipyard on 4 July; Temeraire preceded her at Birkenhead on 1 June. The contract for Conqueror was awarded on 15 August to John Brown, and that of Thunderer was scheduled for 15 November for Fairfield. After the start of the Second World War in September, construction continued desultorily until early October, when it was suspended by the Admiralty for one year; construction of the 16-inch guns and their turrets was to continue. The second pair of Lions were now expected to be laid down in January and April 1941. On 15 November 1939, work on Lion and Temeraire was authorised to resume whenever there was available labour, but it was suspended again in May 1940. In November, the decision to suspend construction was reaffirmed and steel from Lion was ordered transferred to Vanguard.  After thoroughly revising the design in late 1942, the RN's Director of Contracts wrote to Vickers Armstrongs and Cammell Laird "requesting them to clear the slipways and reuse the material on other naval contracts where possible". All design work ceased in April 1943 and armour plates made for Lion were to be scrapped. Only four 16-inch guns, and no turrets, were ever completed. One of the guns was used to test aspects of the Mk IV gun.

Footnotes

Bibliography

 
 
 
 
 
 
 

Abandoned military projects of the United Kingdom
Battleship classes
 
Ship classes of the Royal Navy